Simpson's may refer to:

 Simpsons (department store), defunct Canadian chain, once known as Simpson's
 Simpson's Hospital, Dublin, Ireland, now a nursing home
 Simpson's-in-the-Strand, London, a restaurant
 Simpson's Tavern, pub and restaurant in the City of London

See also
 Simpson (disambiguation)
 The Simpsons (disambiguation)
 The Simpsons, American animated TV sitcom